Mianaj (also Romanized as Mīānaj and Mīyānaj) is a village in Anguran Rural District, Anguran District, Mahneshan County, Zanjan Province, Iran. At the 2006 census, its population was 465, in 104 families.

References 

Populated places in Mahneshan County